This is a list of World Extreme Cagefighting (WEC) champions at each weight class.

In December 2006 World Extreme Cagefighting was bought by Zuffa, LLC, the parent company of the UFC, to concentrate on the four smaller weight classes under the Unified Rules of Mixed Martial Arts. Over the next two years, the WEC would phase out weight classes above 155 lbs, with most of the fighters going to the UFC. By the time of the WEC's absorption into the UFC at the end of 2010, the only remaining weight divisions were Lightweight, Featherweight and Bantamweight.

Discontinued Title Histories

Super Heavyweight Championship
Weight limit: Unlimited

Heavyweight Championship
Weight limit:

Light Heavyweight Championship
Weight limit:

Middleweight Championship
Weight limit:

Welterweight Championship
Weight limit:

Lightweight Championship
Weight limit:

Featherweight Championship
Weight limit:

Bantamweight Championship
Weight limit:

Tournament Winners

Records

Most wins in title bouts

Most consecutive title defenses

Champions by nationality
The division champions includes only linear champions. Interim champions who have never become linear champions will be listed as interim champions. Fighters with multiple title reigns in a specific division will also be counted once. Runners-up are not included in tournaments champions.

See also
 List of WEC events
 List of current mixed martial arts champions
 List of Bellator MMA champions
 List of Dream champions
 List of EliteXC champions
 List of Invicta FC champions
 List of ONE Championship champions
 List of Pancrase champions
 List of Pride champions
 List of PFL champions
 List of Shooto champions
 List of Strikeforce champions
 List of UFC champions
 Mixed martial arts weight classes

References

External links
Current Title Holders at WEC.tv

World Extreme Cagefighting Champions, List Of